Hayravank is a 9th to 12th century Armenian monastery located just northeast of the village of Hayravank along the southwest shores of Lake Sevan in the Gegharkunik Province of Armenia. The monastic complex consists of a church, chapel, and gavit.

Surrounding the monastery are numerous khachkars and gravestones that are part of a small cemetery.  To the northwest a short distance from the site, are the remains of Bronze Age through medieval fortification walls and foundations of a settlement.  A polished black vessel of the Early Bronze Age was discovered during archaeological excavations in the area.  Weapons of metal and stone, tools, clay idols, numerous vessels, fireplaces and two tombs, all from the Iron Age were discovered in the vicinity as well.

Architecture

Church and Chapel 
The church at Hayravank was built during the late 9th century.  It is a quatrefoil cruciform central-plan structure with four semi-circular apses that intersect to create squinches for the octagonal drum and conical dome to stand above.   A small chapel was added in the 10th century, accessed from the southeastern corner of the church.  A single portal leads into the church from the gavit, it is believed that this entry was added between the 12th and 13th centuries. There is a second entrance through the church's exterior on its south side. Exterior walls of the structure differ from the construction of the rest of the complex in that rubble masonry has been incorporated into the façade. The original drum and dome had collapsed completely: their current rebuilt form dates from a restoration undertaken between 1977 and 1989.

Gavit 
The gavit is located west of and adjacent to the church and was added in the 12th century.  A main portal leads into the structure from the western wall, and has an arched tympanum with a worn inscription located above the lintel.  Another portal leads into the gavit from the southern wall.  Two thick columns situated at the western half of the building and two semi-columns at the eastern wall support large arches and a cupola above.  The cupola consists of a short octagonal drum (only seen from the interior) as well as a short octagonal conical dome above decorated with "Harlequin Patterned" stonemasonry.  The pattern alternates with reddish and a lighter grayish colored tufa.  This example is considered to be one of the earliest examples of polychrome decorative masonry that was to become widespread in the following centuries in sacred buildings throughout Armenia.  An oculus at the peak of the dome lets light into the room below.

Gallery

References

Bibliography

External links
 Armeniapedia.org: Hayravank Monastery
 Armenica.org: Hayravank Monastery

Christian monasteries in Armenia
Christian monasteries established in the 9th century
Oriental Orthodox congregations established in the 9th century
Tourist attractions in Gegharkunik Province
Buildings and structures in Gegharkunik Province